The 2010 United States Senate special election in Massachusetts was a special election held on January 19, 2010, in order to fill the Massachusetts Class I United States Senate seat for the remainder of the term ending January 3, 2013.  It was won by Republican candidate Scott Brown.

The vacancy that prompted the special election was created by the death of Democratic Senator Ted Kennedy on August 25, 2009. Kennedy had served as a U.S. Senator since 1962, having been elected in a special election to fill the vacancy created when his brother John F. Kennedy was elected President of the United States in 1960. The seat was held until the election by an appointee, Senator Paul Kirk, a former chairman of the Democratic National Committee, was not a candidate in the election to complete the term. This was the first open seat U.S. senate election in Massachusetts since 1984 and the first in this seat since 1962 where Ted Kennedy was first elected.

A party primary election determining the winners of party nominations was held on December 8, 2009. The Democratic Party nominated Martha Coakley, the Massachusetts Attorney General; the Republican Party nominated Scott Brown, a Massachusetts State Senator. The race drew national attention due to Brown's unexpectedly closing the gap and running even with, or ahead of, Coakley in independent and internal polling in the last few days of the campaign.

Polls closed at 8:00 p.m. Eastern Time. At 9:06 p.m., BNO News projected Brown as the winner of the race. At 9:13 p.m., The Boston Globe reported that Coakley telephoned Brown and conceded her defeat in the election. As a result of the election, the Republicans would control 41 seats in the United States Senate, enough to maintain a filibuster. Although Democrats would retain control of both Houses of Congress until January 2011, Brown's victory would greatly affect their political plans, most notably for the Patient Protection and Affordable Care Act, though the legislation was signed into law two months later.

With his victory, Brown became the first Republican to win this seat since the Democrats captured it in 1952, and the first to win either Massachusetts Senate seat since 1972. Indeed, he was the first Massachusetts Republican to be elected to Congress since Peter Blute and Peter Torkildsen won reelection to the House in 1994. , this is the last congressional election in Massachusetts won by a Republican.

Background

Timeline 
Massachusetts law requires a special election to be held on a Tuesday, no fewer than 145 days, nor more than 160 days from the date of office vacancy, on a date determined by the governor. That range placed the election date between January 17 and February 1, 2010. Massachusetts law specifies that a party primary shall be held the sixth Tuesday before the general election. On August 28, 2009, Secretary of the Commonwealth William F. Galvin presented the dates January 19 and 26, 2010, after meetings with State House Speaker Robert DeLeo, State Senate President Therese Murray, and aides to Governor Deval Patrick. Patrick was legally required to select one of these two dates. A January 19 election would require the primary to be held on December 8, while a January 26 election would have required a December 15 primary. Republican State Representative Karyn Polito suggested on August 28, 2009, that, because the possible election dates overlap the holiday season, the law ought to be rewritten to allow the special election to be held on November 3, 2009, to coincide with other elections in the state.

Patrick stated on August 29, 2009, that he wanted to honor a request by Kennedy that any appointee to the seat not run, and that he would address the issue of the election date "after we have finished this period of respectful grief." On August 31, 2009, Patrick scheduled the special election for January 19, 2010, with the primary elections on December 8, 2009. For party primary candidates, completed nomination papers with certified signatures were required to be filed by the close of business, November 3, 2009. Non-party candidates had a December 8, 2009, filing deadline.

Qualifications 
A senator must, by the date of inauguration, be at least thirty years old, a U.S. citizen for at least nine years, and a state inhabitant of the state wishing to represent. In Massachusetts, candidates for the U.S. Senate must file nomination papers with certified signatures of 10,000 Massachusetts voters, by deadlines established by the Secretary of the Commonwealth. A candidate for nomination in a party's special primary election must have been an enrolled member of the party, through filing as a member of that party with the Secretary of the Commonwealth using a certificate of voter registration, for the 90 days preceding the filing deadline, unless the candidate is a newly registered voter. The candidate additionally must not have been enrolled in any other party in the prior year.

Appointment 

In 2004, the Massachusetts General Court withdrew the authority of the governor to fill a U.S. Senate vacancy by appointment, to prevent the then-Governor Mitt Romney, a Republican, from appointing a Republican to fill the remainder of Democrat John Kerry's Senate term, if Kerry were to win the 2004 presidential election. The legislation was enacted over Romney's veto. At that time, Senator Ted Kennedy successfully made personal appeals to Massachusetts Democratic legislative leaders to pass the bill, which was stalled prior to his request.

Seven days before his death, Kennedy communicated his desire to amend the law so that upon a vacancy, the governor might appoint a Senator to serve until the special election occurred and avoid a five-month vacancy for the office. Kennedy sent a letter to the governor and legislative leaders (received on August 18, 2009, and dated July 2, 2009) requesting that they consider changing the law, and that the Governor obtain the personal pledge of such an appointee not to become a candidate in the following special election. John Kerry, President Barack Obama, and State House Speaker Robert DeLeo all expressed support for an interim appointment.

Patrick stated that he wished to honor the request by Kennedy that any appointee pledge not to run in the special election. The legality of such a demand in state law is questioned by Secretary of the Commonwealth William F. Galvin, as the qualifications for office to Congress are specified solely in the Constitution. Robert DeLeo stated that both the Senate and the House of Representatives planned to approve resolutions indicating that they did not want the appointee to run in the special election or become involved with any candidate's campaign.

A bill previously pending before the legislature, filed by State Rep. Robert Koczera of New Bedford in January 2009, proposed to permit the governor to appoint a senator; to enjoin the governor from appointing a candidate in a subsequent special election; and to permit the appointment date to occur only after the filing deadline for the special election had passed. Governor Patrick said he would push the General Court to pass the bill, and that he would sign it into law. The General Court held its first hearing on the legislation on September 9.

The Massachusetts House of Representatives approved legislation to give Governor Patrick the power to appoint an interim senator on September 17, 2009, by a 95–58 vote. The Massachusetts Senate approved the measure on September 22, 2009, by a vote of 24 to 16, and both houses of the General Court gave final approval to the bill on September 23.

On September 24, 2009, Patrick appointed Paul G. Kirk, former Democratic National Committee chairman and aide to Ted Kennedy, to serve until the elected successor took office. Kennedy's two sons, Patrick J. Kennedy and Edward Kennedy, Jr., and his wife, Victoria Reggie Kennedy, had all expressed their preference for Kirk. Kirk was sworn into office on Friday, September 25, 2009. He pledged not to be a candidate in the special election.

Democratic primary

Candidates 
 Mike Capuano, announced his candidacy on September 18, 2009.
 Martha Coakley, Massachusetts Attorney General, announced her candidacy on September 3, 2009.
 Alan Khazei, co-founder and former CEO of City Year, announced his candidacy on September 24, 2009.
 Stephen Pagliuca, a managing director of private equity firm Bain Capital and managing partner of the Boston Celtics basketball team, announced his candidacy on September 17, 2009.

Polling

Results

Republican primary

Candidates 
 Scott Brown, State Senator
 Jack E. Robinson III, former nominee for U.S. Senate (2000), Secretary of the Commonwealth (2002), and U.S. House of Representatives (2006)

Campaign 
Brown announced his candidacy on September 12, 2009. He previously announced, on September 6, 2009, that he was exploring becoming a candidate under the "testing the waters" provisions of federal election law, and intended to announce his decision on whether he would become a candidate on September 9 or 10, 2009. On September 9, Brown said that he would not run if George W. Bush's White House Chief of Staff Andrew Card entered the race. On September 11, Card declined to run and offered his support to Brown.

Polling

Results

Other candidates 
Independent or third party candidates had until December 8, 2009, to submit nomination papers for signature certification.

 Joseph L. Kennedy, a member of the Libertarian Party, ran as an independent. He has no relation to the politically prominent Kennedy family.

General election campaign 
Scott Brown considered himself a fiscal conservative and Washington, D.C. outsider. He said "I have always thought that being in government service is a privilege, not a right. This Senate seat doesn't belong to any one person or political party. It belongs to you, the people, and the people deserve a U.S. senator who will always put your interests first." Brown had called for fiscal restraint and smaller government, claiming that he had never voted for a tax increase. Brown also pledged to be the 41st vote against the current health care reform bill in the Senate. Assistant Professor Boris Schor of the University of Chicago's Harris School of Public Policy Studies described Brown as a liberal Republican by national standards, but well suited for his Massachusetts constituency. Brown drew attention for having appeared nude and semi-nude with his hands covering his genitals in a centerfold in Cosmopolitan in 1982.

Coakley positioned herself as a liberal, supporting several key initiatives of President Obama's, including healthcare reform. She supported reform that accomplished the three goals of expanding coverage, improving healthcare outcomes and reducing costs. She supported increased regulation of the financial sector, "the protection of abortion rights" and ending the war in Afghanistan. Notably, Coakley took positions to increase equal rights for LGBT individuals; she favors ending Don't Ask, Don't Tell, repealing the Defense of Marriage Act and strengthening hate crimes laws. Coakley refused to investigate Thomas M. Menino, Mayor of Boston, and his office for allegedly violating laws in regards to destruction of public e-mail records. Coakley denies all accusations of misconduct.

She also declined to reprimand the state's District Attorneys in relation to false statements they allegedly made regarding the effects of the state's voter approved Massachusetts Sensible Marijuana Policy Initiative in an attempt to defeat the ballot question, as well as allegations the District Attorneys misused state resources (website) and failed to file as designated ballot committee in a timely manner while receiving contributions as required by law while challenging the initiative. The statements by the District Attorneys included allegedly inaccurate and misleading warnings in an effort to defeat the law, such as that if the law passed "any person may carry and use marijuana at any time." When declining to pursue the case Coakley's office responded with "nothing in the proposed law explicitly forbids public use of the drug." This basically ignores the fact that the law still levies a $100 fine and confiscation for adults, as well as additional mandatory community service for minors for the act of possession, and that using the drug requires possessing it, as well as the fact the law as passed allows cities to pass their own ordinances to further fine public consumption if needed.

The failure to file as a ballot committee allegedly stemmed from the fact state records showed the district attorneys began raising money as early as July 18, 2008, but did not file a statement of organization or any of the appropriate financial disclosures with the state until September 5, 2008. Coakley was herself a member of The Coalition for Safe Streets, the political action group eventually formed by the District Attorneys to fight the ballot question. She stated that she did not feel it was necessary to recuse herself from any decisions based on any possible conflict of interest grounds. In a radio interview on January 16, 2010, Coakley described former Boston Red Sox pitcher Curt Schilling as a "Yankee fan," which drew criticism. Schilling, who considered running for the Senate seat himself and later endorsed Scott Brown, responded by saying "I've been called a lot of things ... but never, I mean never, could anyone make the mistake of calling me a Yankee fan. Well, check that, if you didn't know what the hell is going on in your own state maybe you could ..." Coakley later described the comment as a joke.

Two of Coakley's ads had to be re-edited after they first aired, one because of a typo in spelling Massachusetts (spelling it ), and another which used old stock footage of New York's World Trade Center, destroyed in the September 11 terrorist attacks, to represent Wall Street. The second ad was meant to depict Scott Brown as a Wall Street crony. On January 12, 2010, an altercation occurred between The Weekly Standard journalist John McCormack and Democratic strategist Michael Meehan, in which the journalist was pushed onto the ground while trying to ask Coakley a question. Coakley stated she was aware of the incident but unsure of exactly what happened. Meehan later apologized for being "a little too aggressive," while denying any intention to knock down McCormack.

Coakley's role in the case of Keith Winfield attracted criticism. In October 2005, Winfield, then working as a police officer, was accused of raping his 23-month-old niece with a hot object, most likely a curling iron. A Middlesex County grand jury overseen by Coakley investigated the case and did not take any actions. After the toddler's mother filed applications for criminal complaints, Coakley then obtained grand jury indictments charging rape and assault and battery. She recommended about ten months after the indictment that Winfield be released, without bail. Winfield remained free until December 2007, when he received two life terms in prison in a case prosecuted by Coakley's successor. Coakley defended her decisions, saying that Winfield had a clean record and few other signs of danger.

Joseph L. Kennedy opposed Democratic plans for healthcare reform and vowed, if elected, to work to repeal the legislation. He opposes government spending by both the George W. Bush and Barack Obama administrations. It was suggested that he could have benefited from voters who associated him with the Kennedy family, which he acknowledged, saying "I'm not going to be delusional, there will be hard-core Kennedy voters who will pull the wrong lever." However, Boston University political scientist Thomas Whalen said that Kennedy's libertarian views may cause him to detract votes from Brown rather than Coakley.

CQ Politics and Cook Political Report rated the election as a "Tossup". The Rothenberg Political Report changed its rating from "Tossup" to "Lean Takeover" on January 18. Charlie Cook of the Cook Political Report stated on January 17, said that he would put his "finger on the scale" for Scott Brown as favored to win. The Rothenberg Political Report released a statement that, "unless Democratic turnout exceeds everyone's expectations, Brown is headed for a comfortable win." As of January 18, Brown led Coakley in the Intrade prediction market by high double-digit margins. Statistician Nate Silver of FiveThirtyEight.com projected on January 18 that there was a 75% chance that Brown would defeat Coakley.

During the campaign, controversy erupted over a conscientious objector amendment Brown sponsored in 2005, which, according to The Boston Globe, "would have allowed a doctor, nurse or hospital to deny rape victims an emergency contraceptive if it 'conflicts with a sincerely held religious belief.'" In the candidates' January 5 debate, Brown stated that he continues to support religious hospitals in refusing to provide emergency contraception, causing the woman to go to another hospital. He said, "That's really up to the hospital. There are many, many hospitals that can deal with that situation." Coakley ran a television advertisement attacking Brown over that saying, "Brown even favors letting hospitals deny emergency contraception to rape victims." Brown's daughter Ayla called the Coakley advertisement "completely inaccurate and misleading", and Brown criticized Coakley for running what he described as "attack ads".

Scott Brown filed an ethics complaint stating that the Service Employees International Union (SEIU) Local 509 used state computers and e-mail addresses to direct employees of the state to volunteer for Coakley's campaign. During a State Senate debate in 2001, Brown referred to the decision of his lesbian Democratic opponent, Cheryl Jacques, to have children as "not normal". He also described her parenting role as "alleged family responsibilities." Several Massachusetts LGBT activists condemned the statement. Brown quickly apologized for his "poor choice of words", and he defended his position on that issue as being anti-gay-marriage and pro-civil-unions.

Finances 
, Martha Coakley raised over US$5.2million in total, and had $937,383 cash on hand. Scott Brown had $367,150 cash on hand. Brown spent $450,000 on television advertisements, while Coakley spent $1.4million. A week before the general election, Brown raised $1.3 million from over 16,000 donors in a 24-hour fund-raising effort. Reports also indicated that Brown raised an average of $1 million per day the week prior to the election. This outpouring of support from the Internet and other givers offset what had been relatively less support from national Republican committees, who had decided not to target the race publicly. In the final fundraising push one of Brown's contributions for $5,000 came from David Koch, a wealthy activist and supporter of conservative causes and campaigns. Koch had also given the National Republican Senatorial Committee $30,400 in November 2009 and the Koch Industries PAC gave $15,000 to NRSC right before the January 2010 special election.

Coakley admitted to making an "honest mistake" while filing the financial disclosure forms for her Senate run claiming to have no personal assets when in fact she had an account under her husband's name with over $200,000 and a personal Individual Retirement Account containing approximately $12,000.

Approximately US$23 million was spent on the election.

Debates 
All three candidates participated in the debates. The first was held on the Jim & Margery show in Boston on January 5, and broadcast by WTKK. The January 8 debate was held in Springfield, Massachusetts and broadcast by WGBY-TV. The final debate was held on January 11 at the Edward M. Kennedy Institute at the University of Massachusetts Boston.

Endorsements 
The Boston Herald, the Cape Cod Times, The Eagle-Tribune, the Telegram & Gazette, The Sun The Martha's Vineyard Times, and The Salem News endorsed Brown for the general election, while The Boston Globe The Boston Phoenix, and the Watertown Tab & Press endorsed Coakley. Vicki Kennedy, wife of the late Senator Edward Kennedy, endorsed Coakley, along with other members of the Kennedy family, while former presidential candidates John McCain and Rudy Giuliani, Boston College legend and former NFL quarterback Doug Flutie, and Red Sox pitcher Curt Schilling endorsed Brown. Both former President Bill Clinton and President Barack Obama actively campaigned for Coakley in the final days of the campaign. Former governors Bill Weld and Mitt Romney also endorsed Brown, with Weld actively campaigning with him in places such as Quincy and Romney e-mailing supporters to get out the vote to turn out for Brown on Tuesday. The national Tea Party Express endorsed Brown.

Media 
In regards to the coverage of the election, MSNBC was criticized by one reporter for perceived bias against Brown, while Fox News was accused of favoring Brown. One journalist reported that CNN and Fox News may have delivered more balanced coverage on the election day itself, providing both Republican and Democratic commentators.

On Fox's Hannity on January 11, political commentator Dick Morris solicited donations for a last-minute Brown advertising buy before the election, and said "please, please help (elect Brown)". Brown himself made multiple appearances on various Fox programs within a 24-hour-period, where he made fundraising solicitations during the course of the interviews.

Polling 

On January 14, 2010, Stuart Rothenberg of The Rothenberg Political Report, Charlie Cook of The Cook Political Report and statistician Nate Silver of FiveThirtyEight.com all characterized the race as a tossup. On January 15, 2010, former President Bill Clinton campaigned for Coakley in Worcester, while former Mayor of New York City Rudy Giuliani campaigned for Brown in Boston. President Barack Obama campaigned for Coakley on January 17, 2010. On January 17, Cook said that Brown had become the slight favorite. The Rothenberg Political Report and Nate Silver of FiveThirtyEight.com changed their ratings from "Tossup" to "Lean Takeover" on January 18.

Results 

Polls closed at 8:00pm Eastern Time. At 9:06pm BNO News projected Brown as the winner of the race. At 9:13 p.m., The Boston Globe reported that Coakley telephoned Brown and conceded the election. The best county for Brown was Plymouth, with 62.77%, while the best county for Coakley was Berkshire, with 68.48%.

The final results certified on February 4, 2010 were:

By county 

Source:

By municipality 

The Associated Press and The Boston Globe reported voting results for each of the 351 municipalities in Massachusetts. Brown won in 229 of those 351 municipalities, while Coakley won in 121. Coakley and Brown tied in the small town of Hawley, each receiving 63 votes. In general, Scott Brown drew support from suburban towns in the central and southeastern portions of the state, while Martha Coakley generally fared well in the cities, rural towns in the west and the offshore islands. More specifically, support for Brown tended to be high in Hampden County, the 495 Corridor, the South Shore suburbs and the southwestern part of Cape Cod. Brown also won or ran close to even in a number of historically Democratic working class cities such as Worcester, Lowell and Quincy. Coakley generally fared well in the Berkshires and the cities, and had particularly strong support in college towns such as Amherst, Northampton and Cambridge.

The central and southeastern parts of the state that favored Brown in 2010 experienced steep drops in the Democratic share of the vote – often more than 15% – compared to the vote for Barack Obama in 2008. , towns in those same areas also had a higher average unemployment rate, 8.7%, compared to that of the rest of the state at 7.7%. At 51%, towns where the Democratic share of the vote declined by less than 10% from 2008 for Obama to 2010 for Coakley had a higher percentage of people with a bachelor's degree compared to that of the rest of the state, 31%.

Voter turnout in the 2010 special election was significantly lower than in the 2008 election. The drop in turnout was smallest—around 25%—in areas that supported Obama in the 2008 election by less than 60%. Turnout fell 30% among towns that supported Obama by over 60%. In Boston, which supported Obama by almost 79% in 2008, the decrease in 2010 voter turnout was even more pronounced, at about 35%.

Analysis 
After the election, senior Brown adviser Eric Fehrnstrom stated that the turning point for Brown was the December 30 "JFK ad" which put the campaign on the map. "After that, it was like riding a rocket ship for 2½ to 3 weeks till today," he said. Another widely aired Brown TV ad featured him crisscrossing the state in his 2005 GMC Canyon pickup truck, which had amassed nearly 200,000 miles on the odometer. In his victory speech, Brown said "I'm Scott Brown. I'm from Wrentham. I drive a truck."

Another critical event in the Brown surge was his debate performance on January 11. When asked by moderator David Gergen why he would oppose health care reform while holding the "Kennedy seat," Brown replied, "It's not the Kennedy seat and it's not the Democrats' seat. It's the people's seat." After the debate "people's seat" became a rallying cry for Brown supporters.

Brown's late surge was made possible by support by conservative bloggers, who immediately after the Massachusetts primary began promoting his candidacy among national conservative activists, who sought to challenge the Democrats in every election. At the same time, national Republicans were not publicly targeting the campaign, leading one paper to claim Brown was "left to fend for himself." Undaunted, the Brown campaign succeeded through its moneybomb in raising millions of dollars from Internet donations down the stretch run of the campaign.

Barack Obama named Martha Coakley's controversial rhetorical quote of "What should I do, stand in front of Fenway and shake hands with voters?" as one of five days that shaped his presidency. Obama correlated this quote with Coakley's subsequent loss, and as a hurdle towards the passing of the Patient Protection and Affordable Care Act.

National response 
The election was viewed by conservatives outside of Massachusetts as a referendum against President Barack Obama. However, Brown stated that he didn't believe that it was a referendum on Obama.

Response from Democrats 

 President Barack Obama, via political advisor David Axelrod – "I think that there were a lot of elements to the message [in the election]. Health care was part of it."
 Anthony Weiner (D-NY) – "I think you can make a pretty good argument that health care might be dead."
 Jim Webb (D-VA) – "The race was a referendum not only on health care reform but also on the openness and integrity of our government process. It is vital that we restore the respect of the American people in our system of government and in our leaders. To that end, I believe it would only be fair and prudent that we suspend further votes on health care legislation until Senator-elect Brown is seated."
 Nancy Pelosi (D-CA) – "Whatever happens in Massachusetts, we will pass quality, affordable health care for all Americans and it will be soon."
 Harry Reid (D-NV) – "We're not going to rush into anything, we're going to wait until the new senator arrives before we do anything more on health care."
 Steny Hoyer (D-MD) – "We will all be making a mistake if we believe that the message that was delivered in Massachusetts last night was unique to Massachusetts. That anger was directed, frankly, at all of us."
 Barney Frank (D-MA) – "I think the measure that would have passed, that is, some compromise between the House and Senate bill, which I would have voted for, although there were some aspects of both bills I would have liked to see change, I think that's dead. It is certainly the case that the bill that would have passed, a compromise between the House and Senate bills, isn't going to pass, in my judgment, and certainly shouldn't. We are back to where we were maybe even years ago. That is, there is now no bill that I believe can pass or should pass. Sen. Snowe may be willing to work now with her Democratic colleagues, and maybe 3, 4, 5, 6 other Republicans would be, to try and put something together. If that's not the case, and Sen. Snowe and others aren't for some fairly significant changes, then we'll go into the election with the health care status quo."
 Debbie Stabenow (D-MI) – "At this point, we'll be looking to see what the mood of the House is and what they want to do. There's no willingness to abandon ship on healthcare. I would be very satisfied if the House passed what the Senate did and then we can work on those areas that need to be strengthened or fixed. Those of us who worked very hard on the Senate bill believe that this is a good bill. It's not perfect; neither is the House bill. But the reality is, this would be a major step forward for lowering costs for families [and] small businesses [and] strengthening Medicare."
 Russ Feingold (D-WI) – "It's probably back to the drawing board on health care, which is unfortunate, because everybody agrees we have to do something about health care and so it would be unfortunate to lose this whole effort."

Response from Republicans, conservatives, and news outlets 
Republicans and conservatives nationally were elated at the results, with some commentators and news outlets calling the results the "Massachusetts Miracle" both before and after the election was held.  Federally-elected Republicans also responded favorably to the results of the contest:

 John Cornyn (R-TX) – "Democrats nationwide should be on notice: Americans are ready to hold the party in power accountable for their irresponsible spending and out-of-touch agenda, and they're ready for real change in Washington. This is very energizing to a lot of people, Republicans and independents."
 Mitch McConnell (R-KY) – "There's a reason the nation was focused on this race. The American people have made it abundantly clear that they're more interested in shrinking unemployment than expanding government. They're tired of bailouts. They're tired of the government spending more than ever at a time when most people are spending less. And they don't want the government taking over health care."
 John Boehner (R-OH) – "For nine months, I've talked to you about the political rebellion that's been brewing in America. It manifested itself in August at town hall meetings around the country. We saw it manifest itself in what happened in Virginia and New Jersey back in November. And we saw it manifest itself again last night in Massachusetts, when the people of Massachusetts stood up and said, 'enough is enough.' And it's pretty clear that while the American people continue to speak, the Democrat leadership here in this House continues to ignore them and is looking for some way to continue to press this health care bill to a vote."
 Eric Cantor (R-VA) – "The American people, the people of Massachusetts last night have rejected the arrogance. They are tired of being told by Washington how to think and what to do,"
 John McCain (R-AZ) – "Last night, a shot was fired around this nation: saying no more business as usual in Washington, D.C."
 Olympia Snowe (R-ME) – "I never say anything is dead, but I think that clearly they're going to have to revisit the entire issue. I think that was true from the outset. I think there were a lot of concerns that ultimately, collectively manifested themselves in yesterday's vote. The American people are rightfully frustrated and they should be. This process is not becoming of this institution, the United States Congress. You can't drive a policy that doesn't have the support of the American people."
 Susan Collins (R-ME) – "They want better performance out of Washington, they want us focusing on the troubled economy and the need for more jobs and they're tired of sweetheart deals that were sneaked into the health care bill. They want that kind of bill to be negotiated in the open. And they're tired of politics as usual and they also want controls. They don't want unfettered, one-party control, and a bill that imposes billions of dollars for new taxes, slashes Medicare by $500 billion and would actually cause insurance rates to go up. We really should start from scratch and do a completely bipartisan bill."

See also 
 List of United States senators from Massachusetts
 United States Senate special election in Alabama, 2017

Notes

References

External links 
 Elections Division of Massachusetts Secretary of the Commonwealth]
 Massachusetts U.S. Senate from OurCampaigns.com
 Campaign contributions from Open Secrets
 2010 Massachusetts Senate Special graph of multiple polls from Pollster.com
 2010 Massachusetts Senate Race from CQ Politics
 Media coverage
 The 2010 Massachusetts Senate Race from The Boston Globe
 Local Politics from the Boston Herald
 Debates
 Massachusetts Senate Democratic Candidate Debate C-SPAN, October 26, 2009
 Debate on the Jim and Margery radio show in Boston, broadcast by WTKK (podcast part1 and part2), January 5, 2010
 Debate at Springfield, broadcast by WGBY-TV (QuickTime video and Windows Media Video), January 8, 2010
 US Senate Debate, Edward M. Kennedy Institute at the University of Massachusetts Boston YouTube, January 11, 2010
 Massachusetts Senate Debate, C-SPAN, January 11, 2010
 Official campaign sites
 Scott Brown for Senate
 Mike Capuano for Senate
 Martha Coakley for Senate
 Joe Kennedy for Senate
 Alan Khazei for Senate
 Steve Pagliuca for Senate
 Jack E Robinson for Senate

United States Senate
Massachusetts
2010
Massachusetts 2010
Massachusetts Senate
United States Senate 2010